On 2 November 2020, allegedly a group of up to 60 gunmen attacked a schoolyard in the village of Gawa Qanqa in the Guliso District of West Welega Zone in the Oromia Region of Ethiopia, killing 32-54 people. The state-run Ethiopian Human Rights Commission said the attack had targeted people of the Amhara ethnic group. 200 people were gathered by an armed group for a meeting and then were shot at by the armed group. Soldiers had reportedly left the area hours before the attack. The Oromia Regional Government blamed the Oromo Liberation Army for the attack,  who denied responsibility. Prime Minister Abiy Ahmed denounced the attack and promised a thorough investigation. Ethnic violence has increased since he took office.

See also
 Gimbi massacre
 Hachalu Hundessa riots
 Qelem Wollega massacre

References

2020 murders in Ethiopia
2020 mass shootings in Africa
21st-century mass murder in Africa
Attacks on schools in Africa
Ethiopian civil conflict (2018–present)
Mass shootings in Ethiopia
Massacres in 2020
Massacres in Ethiopia
November 2020 crimes in Africa
Gawa Qanqa massacre
Oromia Region
School killings in Africa
School shootings
School massacres
Massacres of Amhara people